Raikot is a village in Diamer district, Gilgit-Baltistan, Pakistan.  It is famous for hosting the Raikot Bridge.  It is situated along the Indus River.

Tourism 
There are many restaurants and hotels in Raikot and is a route to Nanga Parbat.  One of the most famous hotels is Raikot Serai.  It also in the Fairy Meadows area, a base camp for Nanga Parbat.

References 

Villages in Pakistan